The Mueller River is a river of the West Coast Region of New Zealand's South Island. It flows generally north from its sources in the Southern Alps, reaching the Turnbull River 14 kilometres from the latter's mouth. The entire length of the Mueller River is within Mount Aspiring National Park.

See also
List of rivers of New Zealand

References

Rivers of the West Coast, New Zealand
Westland District
Mount Aspiring National Park
Rivers of New Zealand